Vincent Moon (real name Mathieu Saura, born 25 August 1979) is an independent filmmaker, photographer, and sound artist from Paris. He was the main director of the Blogotheque's Take Away Shows, a web-based project recording field work music videos of indie rock related musicians as well as some notable mainstream artists like Tom Jones, R.E.M., or Arcade Fire.

Vincent Moon is known for traveling around the globe with a camera in his backpack, documenting local folklores, sacred music and religious rituals, for his label Collection Petites Planètes. He works alone or with people he finds on the road, and most of the time without money involved in the projects. He shares much of his work, films and music recordings, for free on internet, under Creative Commons license. In 2009 his documentary on artist Kazuki Tomokawa, La Faute Des Fleurs, won the Sound & Vision Award at the Copenhagen International Documentary Festival, and his film Esperando el Tsunami was nominated for the same award in 2011.

Music career

Early Period (2000–2005)
Growing up in Paris, Vincent Moon studied photography for 3 years at the Atelier Reflexe in Montreuil, where he met the photographers Michael Ackerman and Antoine d’Agata, who informed Vincent Moon's experiments of style//approach and visual experiments. Working as a photographer at the time, he used to put his photos in motion, using simple slideshow techniques and music to tell stories. In 2003, he started the photography blog Les Nuits de Fiume, documenting Parisian nightlife.

As a result of his encounter with the work of experimental filmmakers Peter Tscherkassky and Stephen Dwoskin, Vincent Moon started to move toward films in 2005. He made short films, mixing intimate storytelling experiment with various techniques, from super 8 to cellphone cameras. He was quick to grasp the various possibilities the internet offered for releasing and sharing his work online and freely. Getting closer and closer to the music world, he encountered the band The National in one of their shows in Paris. Their friendship gave birth to various projects, his photos being used on the cover of The National's third album, 'Alligator', and he made for them 2 music videos. At this time, he also initiated other projects related to music, directing lo-fi videos for Clogs, Sylvain Chauveau and Barzin.

The Take Away Shows (2006–2009)

In 2006, inspired by the film Step Across the Border on the English guitarist Fred Frith and pushed by its desire to record music in a more creative way, Vincent Moon created with Christophe 'Chryde' Abric the 'Concert à Emporter / Take Away Shows' project, La Blogotheque's popular video podcast. The Take Away Shows is a series of improvised outdoor video sessions with musicians, set in unexpected locations and broadcast freely on the web. In four years, they managed to shoot over two hundred videos with bands like REM, Arcade Fire, Sufjan Stevens, Tom Jones, Beirut, Grizzly Bear, and Sigur Ros and many more, always in the field of rock and pop music, mostly focused on north-American music. Vincent Moon perfected his style: an immediately recognizable intimacy, always with fragile and dancing long shots, often filmed in one take without rehearsal.

The Take Away Shows quickly gathered a large online following and The New York Times presented its impact as 'Vincent Moon reinvented the music video'. An entire new generation of young filmmakers around the world recognized the influence of the whole concept, this natural organic approach to music. A study from 2010 showed that more than 100 online film projects were directly inspired by La Blogothèque's Take Away Shows.

The large amount of clips is the result of a very fast filming process with mostly one take recordings in a way comparable to the Dogme 95 concept. Comparable with the field recordings of Alan Lomax or the Peel Sessions of John Peel, Moon has set up a large collection of unique single take recordings enhanced with artistic filmed video footage. The fast filming process he uses is a form of guerrilla film making. The sessions are usually two or three tracks filmed improvised in an unusual environment and as such they often had a rough and ready, demo-like feel, somewhere between a live performance and a finished music video. These live, unusually staged performances differ from the artifice of traditional music videos in favor of single-take, organic and primarily acoustic sessions.

Other musical collaborations (2007–2010)

Following the success of the Blogotheque project, many artists, more established, asked Moon to work on longer films. Most of those projects became new explorations in relationship between music and sound, and a defiance towards pre-established formats of music films.

Michael Stipe became aware of the works of Moon and as a fan he asked him to make a film project for his band. In 2007 and 2008, Moon collaborated with Michael Stipe and R.E.M. on several video and web projects related to their album 'Accelerate.'  The various experimental projects that came out of this collaboration include the 48min essay 6 DAYS, the experimental ninety-days-long web project called 90 NIGHTS, the video and the website for the single SUPERNATURAL SUPERSERIOUS, and the acclaimed THIS IS NOT A SHOW (co-directed by Jeremiah), a live movie on their Dublin performances in the summer of 2007.
The project ninetynights.com was a website dedicated to reveal little by little the new R.E.M. album, in the beginning of 2008. Over a period of 90 days, one shot would appear everyday on the website, at first very mysterious and without music, then little by little showing the band members and the songs. Each video was downloadable in high resolution, to let anybody make its own edit. Moon and Jeremiah's edit resulted in SIX DAYS, a semi-experimental approach of the music of REM. For the "Supernatural Superserious" project, Moon and Jeremiah shot a series of 12 clips published on a special website for free download as well as on YouTube. The music video was shot in various locations around New York City. On 12 February 2008 the website supernaturalsuperserious.com was launched, containing ten takes of the video available for download in high definition as well as a YouTube page for users to upload their own versions of the video. Afterwards Moon also directed the music video of the single "Until the Day Is Done".

Other projects at the time included a one-hour film with Beirut in collaboration with La Blogotheque, CHEAP MAGIC INSIDE, a film about Beirut (band). All the 12 songs from the new album 'The Flying Club Cup' were filmed in the streets of Brooklyn, in a one-take experiment.

From 2005 to 2009, Vincent Moon recorded the ATP Music Festival, an independent rock festival from the UK. His images ended up in the film ALL TOMORROW'S PARTIES (2009, 90min), co-directed by Jonathan Caouette, and was released to critical acclaims. Vincent Moon's series of 7 experimental gonzo films from the same festival were released later under the name FROM ATP.

In November 2008, Vincent Moon traveled to Prague with longtime collaborators Antoine Viviani and Gaspar Claus to document the mythical Havlovi, a couple of musicians who dedicated their life to their instruments, the ancient viola da gamba. The result, LITTLE BLUE NOTHING (2009, 50min) has been screened in several cities around the world, and was released in 2014 on limited-series DVD.

In March 2009, cellist Gaspar Claus and Vincent Moon embarked on a journey to Japan to portray the cult poet, musician and painter Kazuki Tomokawa. The film LA FAUTE DES FLEURS, sometimes considered Moon's best work, has won the Sound & Vision Award at the documentary film festival CPH DOX 2009 in Denmark. A rare thing for Moon, as he never submits his work for competitions.

In April 2009, he organized and recorded a concert of singer Lhasa de Sela in Montreal, to promote her new album. This concert was Lhasa's last one in Canada, as she died later that year. The films were later released online.
Later that month, Moon was working with the cult post rockers from Glasgow, Mogwai, around their live show in New York City. BURNING, a 50' live film from that performance, co-directed by Nathanael Le Scouarnec, represents a radical vision of live music, a unique attempt in documenting music on stage, and has been considered one of the best music films in history.

During the year 2009, Moon started to explore other approaches to music, leaving a little bit the Take Away Shows project to other filmmakers, and created his own blog Fiume Nights, where he started to write ideas about media, culture and creation in the 21st century, and continued to make short films.

His last project in the field of rock music would be AN ISLAND, recorded in August 2010 with Danish band Efterklang on their native island of Als. Vincent Moon and Efterklang released the film exclusively online in January 2011, developing of a new method of film distribution called 'private-public screenings' – people who want to see the film have to organize their own screenings. The massive success of the operation (over 1100 home screenings to date) led to a new concept in online cinema.

In March 2011, Vincent Moon teamed up with the electronic folk duo Lulacruza to explore the musical cultures of urban and provincial Colombia. The resulting work, Esperando El Tsunami, has been released in November 2011, using the distribution system of 'private-public screenings', first used in An Island.

Collection Petites Planètes, exploring the world of sound (2009–2014)
In December 2008, Vincent Moon left Paris and most of his previous work behind to explore new horizons. He quit La Blogothèque soon after, even though he continued from time to time to contribute with some films, and decided to set up his new personal ‘nomadic’ label – Collection Petites Planètes.
Under this new project, he explored and recorded traditional music, religious rituals, relationships between music and trance over the five continents. These 'experimental ethnography' films mark a clear departure from his earlier line of work on alternative and indie music scenes – the films are more subtle, the camera more quiet, the form evolves towards some unique bridge between the work of Robert Gardner and the recordings of Alan Lomax.
Everywhere he went, he relied on local connections and never collaborated with standard production companies, instead working as much as possible with people who contacted him in the years of La Blogothèque.
Moon has been traveling in Chile, Argentina, Cambodia, Egypt, Poland, Iceland, Brazil, Colombia, Turkey, Sardinia, Indonesia, Singapore, Hong Kong, Australia, the Philippines, Croatia, Ethiopia, Russia, Uruguay, Peru, the Caucasus, Vietnam and Laos for the Collection Petites Planètes since 2010. Always making films with and of the local people, and constantly sharing them under a Creative Commons licence on the internet.
Collection Petites Planètes is funded almost exclusively through donations on his website, and through the screenings and workshops given during his travels. Rejecting traditional professionalism in favor of twenty-first century amateurism, he collaborates with local creators and young talent all over the world. Vincent Moon is currently traveling the world, questioning the established norms of visual representations of the 'other'.

Into the sacred (2014–present)
At the turn of the year 2014, after 5 years traveling, Vincent Moon switched his way of living and working to explore deeper into one subject with his partner the explorer and filmmaker Priscilla Telmon — the renewal of sacred in our generation. Their first project is the multimedia project and feature-length film HIBRIDOS, set up in Brazil, and exploring the various cults in the country, from afro-Brazilian beliefs to more recent syncretic aspects, weaving a very complex idea of where human and spirits stands amongst the fast pace of nowadays world. Together they create the collection Petites Planètes, collaborate as independent filmmakers and sound explorers on the sacred, trance and altered states of consciousness.

Awards

Filmography

Feature films

Further reading
Interviews
An Interview with Vincent Moon by SoundsandColors
Take Away Videos: New York Times
A fortuitous rendez-vous with Vincent Moon Written by: Gabi Leașcu

Filmographies

See also
Music video directors

References

External links

Living people
Film directors from Paris
French music video directors
1979 births
French experimental filmmakers